The Robson Glacier is the primary source of the short Robson River, one of the uppermost tributaries of the Fraser River. Located on the British Columbia-Alberta Boundary and the Continental Divide to the east of Berg Lake in Mount Robson Provincial Park, it sits on the northeast flank of Mount Robson in Mount Robson Provincial Park, British Columbia in the Canadian Rockies.  Its meltwater feeds unofficially named Robson Lake, whose outlet marks the start of the Robson River.

See also
List of glaciers

References

External links
 BC Parks

Glaciers of British Columbia
Glaciers of Alberta
Canadian Rockies
Robson Valley
Great Divide of North America